James Cuthbert Gentle (July 21, 1904 – May 22, 1986) was an American soccer striker, field hockey player, soldier, and golfer.  He is a member of the National Soccer Hall of Fame.

Youth
Born outside Boston in Brookline, Massachusetts, Gentle grew up in his hometown, attended Brookline High School.  In 1922, he entered the University of Pennsylvania where he played football as a freshman.  He switched to soccer and track for his next three years at Penn, earning first team All American honors for soccer in 1924 and 1925.  Gentle graduated from the university's Wharton School with a bachelor's degree in economics in 1926.  Active in student government, Gentle was his class president and a member of the Mask and Wig and Varsity Club.

Soccer

Player
During his time at Penn, Gentle played one game, as an amateur, with the professional Boston Wonder Workers of the American Soccer League.  Following his graduation, Gentle signed with the Philadelphia Field Club.  In 1930, Gentle was called into the U.S. national team for the 1930 World Cup.  Besides his duties as a striker, Gentle also acted as an interpreter for the American team and officials as he was the only person fluent in Spanish.

Coach
In 1935, Haverford College hired Gentle to coach its men's soccer team.  Over six seasons, Gentle took Haverford to a 39-26-3 record and two Mid-American Conference titles.

In 1986, Gentle was inducted into the National Soccer Hall of Fame.

Army
Gentle joined the Army Reserves in 1931.  When the U.S. entered World War II Gentle was assigned to the 36th Infantry regiment.  His unit was deployed to the European Theater where it fought at Salerno, the mountains behind Monte Cassino. Another battle was fought at the Gari River in Italy.  Finally he joined General Patton's forces as they moved across Europe and into the Rhineland. At the end of the war, Gentle, now a major, was named U.S. trade and industry officer for the American zone of Germany.  He retired from the Army in 1956 in the rank of colonel.

Other sports
Gentle was a member of the U.S. field hockey team which earned a bronze medal during Olympic Games of 1932 in Los Angeles.

Later in life, Gentle became interested in golf and became a member of the International Team of the American Senior Golf Association. He died in 1986 in Philadelphia.

Insurance industry
In 1931, in addition to joining Army Reserves, Gentle as began working at Mutual Life Insurance Company. In addition to his military duties and athletic interests, Gentle continued to work full-time in the insurance industry

References

External links
 
 Profile at the National Soccer Hall of Fame
 University of Pennsylvania profile

1930 FIFA World Cup players
American male golfers
Golfers from Massachusetts
American soccer players
American male field hockey players
Field hockey players at the 1932 Summer Olympics
Field hockey players at the 1936 Summer Olympics
National Soccer Hall of Fame members
Olympic bronze medalists for the United States in field hockey
Penn Quakers men's soccer players
Sportspeople from Brookline, Massachusetts
Soccer players from Massachusetts
American Soccer League (1921–1933) players
Boston Soccer Club players
Philadelphia Field Club players
American soccer coaches
Haverford Fords men's soccer coaches
1904 births
1986 deaths
United States Army colonels
Medalists at the 1932 Summer Olympics
Association football forwards
Brookline High School alumni